Trent Dalzell (born 15 October 1988) is an Australian actor. He is best known for his role as Axel Hay on the Australian soap opera Home and Away. He is also known for playing Corey Petrie during the second season of Blue Water High.

Filmography

Film

Television

References

External links

Living people
Australian male soap opera actors
People from Wollongong
1989 births